Sharon Maria Rebecca Beck (born 22 March 1995) is a German-born Israeli footballer who plays as a midfielder for German club 1. FC Köln and the Israel women's national team.

Early life
Beck was born in St. Tönis, Germany, to a father of Israeli Jewish background originally from Germany as well.

Club career

International career

Germany
Beck was first called-up to the German national team for the 2018 SheBelieves Cup. She was on the bench for all three matches, but didn't take the field.

Israel
Beck has been capped for the Israel national team, appearing for the senior squad during the 2019 FIFA Women's World Cup qualifiers.

International goals

See also
List of Israelis
List of Jews in Sports
Sports in Israel

References

External links
 
 
 

1995 births
Living people
Israeli women's footballers
Israel women's international footballers
Women's association football defenders
Footballers from North Rhine-Westphalia
People from Viersen (district)
Sportspeople from Düsseldorf (region)
Israeli people of German descent
Israeli people of German-Jewish descent
German women's footballers
SC Freiburg (women) players
Frauen-Bundesliga players
1. FC Köln (women) players
German people of Israeli descent
German people of Jewish descent